Bad Day or Bad Days may refer to:

Film and TV
 Bad Day (viral video), a viral Internet video
 Bad Day (film), a 2008 direct-to-DVD film
 "Bad Day" (TMNT 2003 Episode), a 2005 episode of Teenage Mutant Ninja Turtles

Music

Albums
 The Bad Days EP, a 1998 EP single by Space

Songs
 "Bad Day" (Daniel Powter song), 2005
 "Bad Day" (Fuel song), 2001
 "Bad Day" (Justin Bieber song), 2013
 "Bad Day" (R.E.M. song), 2003
 "Bad Day", by Blur from Leisure, 1991
 "Bad Day", by Carmel from The Drum is Everything, 1983
 "Bad Day", by Juliana Hatfield from Bed, 1998
 "Bad Days", by Moby from Ambient
 "Bad Days", by The Flaming Lips from Clouds Taste Metallic
 "Bad Days", by Tove Lo from Blue Lips